Mount MacKenzie is a volcanic peak, located  northeast of Hagensborg, British Columbia, Canada. It is one of the volcanic peaks of the Rainbow Range, which is one of the three major shield volcanoes that form the Anahim Volcanic Belt. Mount MacKenzie was formed when the North American Plate moved over a hotspot, similar to the one feeding the Hawaiian Islands, known as the Anahim hotspot.

See also
 List of volcanoes in Canada
 Volcanology of Canada
 Volcanology of Western Canada

References

Anahim Volcanic Belt
Volcanoes of British Columbia
Two-thousanders of British Columbia
Range 3 Coast Land District